DC League of Super-Pets is a 2022 American 3D computer-animated superhero comedy film based on the DC Comics superhero team Legion of Super-Pets. Produced by Warner Animation Group, DC Entertainment, and Seven Bucks Productions and distributed by Warner Bros. Pictures, it was directed by Jared Stern and co-directed by Sam J. Levine from a screenplay by Stern and John Whittington. The film stars Dwayne Johnson as the voice of Krypto, alongside a supporting ensemble voice cast that includes Kevin Hart, Kate McKinnon, John Krasinski, Vanessa Bayer, Natasha Lyonne, Diego Luna, Marc Maron, Thomas Middleditch, Ben Schwartz, and Keanu Reeves. The film tells the story of Superman's pet dog Krypto and shelter dog Ace who work with other animals to save the captured superheroes from Lex Luthor and Lulu.

During the early days of Warner Animation Group, Stern pitched the film in 2012, after working in an animal shelter, where he noticed how older animals were less likely to be adopted and wondered about the idea of those pets having superpowers. He was hired to write and direct a film about DC's Legion of Super-Pets in July 2018. Levine and Patricia Hicks joined the project in January 2019 as co-director and producer, respectively. Johnson was signed on to voice Krypto in May 2021, while other main cast members were confirmed to join the voice roles by June 2021, including Hart, McKinnon, Krasinski, Bayer, Lyonne, Luna, Maron, and Reeves. The inspiration for the film's animation style came from Art Deco architecture and illustrator J.C. Leyendecker. The animation was provided by Animal Logic.

DC League of Super-Pets had its premiere in Los Angeles on July 27, 2022, and was released in the United States on July 29. The film received generally positive reviews from critics and grossed over $207 million worldwide on a $90 million budget.

Plot
Superman grows up with a Kryptonian Labrador Retriever named Krypto, who goes by the name Bark Kent in everyday life. Krypto feels jealous when Superman starts dating Lois Lane, so Superman goes to an animal shelter to find Krypto a friend. A Boxer named Ace tries to escape the shelter, but Krypto stops him. Later, Superman and Krypto spot their archenemy, LexCorp CEO Lex Luthor, reeling in a meteor strapped with orange kryptonite with a tractor beam, intending to gain superpowers. He is easily defeated as the two are aided by the Justice League.

Meanwhile, Lulu, a guinea pig test subject from LexCorp sent to the shelter, reels in a piece of orange kryptonite with her own tractor beam, which gives her flight and telekinesis. Unbeknownst to her, everyone else in the shelter also gains superpowers. Ace is now super-strong and indestructible; PB, a potbellied pig, can change size; Merton, a nearsighted turtle, becomes super-fast; and Chip, a paranoid squirrel, gains electrokinesis. While at home, Superman and Krypto have an argument when the former plans to propose marriage to Lois. However, Clark is captured by Lulu. Krypto tries to save him, but loses his powers after eating some green kryptonite hidden inside a piece of Jarlsberg cheese. Later, Krypto comes across the shelter pets, who agree to help him.

Meanwhile, Lulu recruits a group of guinea pigs, captures the Justice League, and heads to Stryker's Island to free Luthor. The shelter pets try to stop her, but fail miserably. They regroup in the Hall of Justice, where Ace tells a distraught Krypto he used to be the puppy of a family with a toddler. One day, the toddler nearly fell down the stairs when Ace bit her arm and pulled her to safety. Upon seeing the bite-marks, the parents assumed Ace attacked her and sent him to the shelter. However, Ace stands by his actions and ideals. Encouraged, Krypto leads the pets to LexCorp. While there, a kitten named Whiskers, who Lulu rescued from the shelter and can now create weapons at will, attacks them, but the team traps her. At Stryker's Island, the shelter pets confront Lulu, but put themselves in prison cells when she threatens to kill Krypto. Lulu frees Luthor, who betrays her and locks her in his cell while freeing Mercy Graves. Lulu breaks out easily and decides to destroy the Justice League and Luthor herself.

The Kryptonite passes through Krypto's system, restoring his powers. He breaks himself and the other super pets out of prison, and attempts to free the Justice League, but Lulu launches them into space, along with Luthor. The other super pets rescue the Justice League while Krypto defeats Lulu, but she absorbs the orange kryptonite, becoming a mutated kaiju-sized version of herself. The League and the pets team up to stop her. Realizing she has become too powerful, Krypto decides to use the "Solar Paw Punch", a move that can defeat any supervillain, but will likely kill the user. The attack causes a massive explosion that removes the kryptonite from Lulu's brain and, shortly thereafter, her redeemed henchmen, Mark and Keith, trap her in a hot dog stand. Krypto accepts his fate, but Ace uses his invulnerability to save him.

In the aftermath, Krypto allows Clark to marry Lois. The shelter pets, Mark, and Keith get adopted by the rest of the Justice League, with Ace being adopted by Batman. Sometime later, the pets have formed their own superhero team called the "League of Super-Pets".

In a mid-credits scene, Luthor is still trapped in his prison asking any passing super-animals to free him. Meanwhile, Lulu is freed by Mercy, who adopts her.

In a post-credits scene, Krypto and Superman encounter Black Adam and his dog, Anubis. Krypto tricks them into flying to Pluto.

Voice cast
 Dwayne Johnson as:
 Krypto / Bark Kent / Superdog, a Kryptonian Labrador Retriever and Superman's pet dog. 
 Anubis, Black Adam's pet dog who hates when people refer to his owner as a villain instead of an anti-hero.
 Teth-Adam / Black Adam, an anti-hero that appears in the post-credits ending, as a reference to his then-upcoming role in the DC Extended Universe.
 Kevin Hart as Ace / Bat-Hound, a Boxer who gains super strength and invulnerability after coming in contact with Orange Kryptonite. He later becomes Batman's pet dog. According to Krypto, he is 3/4 Chihuahua.
 Kate McKinnon as Lulu, an evil hairless guinea pig who gains flight and telekinesis through Orange Kryptonite.  She later becomes Mercy Graves' pet.
 John Krasinski as Kal-El / Clark Kent / Superman, a superhero from Krypton who protects Metropolis and Krypto's owner.
 Vanessa Bayer as PB, a potbellied pig who gains the ability to change her size in scale after coming in contact with Orange Kryptonite and admires Wonder Woman, whose pet she becomes later.
 Natasha Lyonne as Merton McSnurtle / Terrific Whatzit, a red-eared slider with poor eyesight who gains super speed after coming in contact with Orange Kryptonite. She later becomes Flash's pet.
 Diego Luna as Chip, a paranoid red squirrel who gains electrokinesis after coming in contact with Orange Kryptonite and speaks with a strong Spanish accent. He later becomes the Green Lantern (Jessica Cruz)'s pet.
 Marc Maron as Lex Luthor, the CEO of LexCorp and Superman's arch-nemesis.
 Keanu Reeves as Bruce Wayne / Batman, a vigilante superhero who protects Gotham City. He later becomes Ace's owner.
 Thomas Middleditch as Keith, a white guinea pig who was recruited by Lulu who was empowered by Orange Kryptonite where he possesses cryokinesis (later hydrokinesis after Lulu smashes him against Mark). He later becomes Aquaman's pet and joins the team.
 Julia Morris portrays Keith in the Australian version.
 Ben Schwartz as Mark, a brown guinea pig who also was recruited by Lulu who was empowered by Orange Kryptonite where he possesses pyrokinesis. He later becomes Cyborg's pet and joins the team.
 Chris Brown portrays Mark in the Australian release.
 Olivia Wilde as Lois Lane, a reporter of the Daily Planet and Clark's girlfriend.
 Jameela Jamil as Diana Prince / Wonder Woman, an Amazon princess and superheroine from Themyscira. She later becomes PB's owner.
 Jemaine Clement as Arthur Curry / Aquaman, an Atlantean demigod, superhero, and the king of Atlantis. He later becomes Keith's owner.
 John Early as Barry Allen / The Flash, a police forensic scientist and superhero who protects Central City with his immense superspeed. He later becomes Merton's owner.
 Daveed Diggs as Victor Stone / Cyborg, a former football player and superhero who gained cybernetics after an accident. He later becomes Mark's owner.
 Dascha Polanco as Jessica Cruz / Green Lantern, a superheroine and member of the Green Lantern Corps. She later becomes Chip's owner.
 Keith David as Dog-El, Krypto's father.
 Sam J. Levine as:
 The Robot Guards at Stryker's Island.
 Waffles, a Boston Terrier that interacts with Krypto in the park.
 Richard Arnold portrays Waffles in the UK version.
 Sean Lee portrays Waffles in the Malaysian English version.
 Maya Erskine as Mercy Graves, Lex Luthor's henchwoman and bodyguard. She later becomes Lulu's owner.
 Yvette Nicole Brown as Patty, the owner of an animal shelter.
 Alfred Molina as Jor-El, Superman's biological father.
 Lena Headey as Lara, Superman's biological mother.
 Busy Philipps as Foofy Dog, a dog that interacts with Krypto in the park.
 Dan Fogler as:
 Carl, Patty's assistant who constantly tries to hit on her.
 Pilot
 Racer
 Winona Bradshaw as Whiskers, a kitten with weapon abilities who tries to kill the Super-Pets for Lulu as a thank you for rescuing her. She appears later in a mid-credits scene where Luthor is still trapped in the park as she passes by him.
 David Pressman as a Welsh Corgi waiting outside the shelter with Krypto, who later gains size manipulation.
 Munya Chawawa portrays the corgi in the UK version.
 Jared Stern as:
 A guy in a bathtub whose bath keeps getting disrupted by the animals.
 JLA Hotline
 Michelle Morgan as the A.I. for Lex Luthor's Mech Suit
 Amanda Ames as Guinea-Pigasus, a guinea pig who was recruited by Lulu and empowered by Orange Kryptonite, which gave him the wings and hindquarters of a bird.
 Gavin McCrillis as Black Kitten
 Andre Hyland as Storm
 Mark Walton as Topo

Production

Development
In July 2018, Jared Stern was hired to write and direct an animated film about DC's Legion of Super-Pets. In January 2019, it was announced that Sam J. Levine would serve as co-director with Stern, and that Patricia Hicks had signed on as producer. The film was pitched by Stern in 2012, during the early days of the Warner Animation Group.

In May 2021, it was announced that Dwayne Johnson would star as the voice of Krypto the Superdog. In addition to starring in the film, he, alongside Dany Garcia, Hiram Garcia, and Stern would be joining Hicks as producers; while John Requa, Glenn Ficarra, and Nicholas Stoller were set to executive produce.

In June 2021, additional cast members were announced, with Kevin Hart starring as the voice of Ace the Bat-Hound in the film. Additionally, Kate McKinnon, John Krasinski, Vanessa Bayer, Natasha Lyonne, Diego Luna, and Keanu Reeves were cast in undisclosed roles. The following week, Jameela Jamil joined the film. By September 2021, Marc Maron had joined the cast as the voice of Lex Luthor. By November of the same year, additional roles were revealed to be: Chip, Green Lantern's squirrel (Luna); Merton, The Flash's turtle (Lyonne); PB, Wonder Woman's pig (Bayer), Superman (Krasinski) and newer additions, Thomas Middleditch and Ben Schwartz. In March 2022, Reeves was revealed to be voicing Batman. The following month, it was revealed that Dascha Polanco would be voicing Jessica Cruz / Green Lantern. Three weeks before the film's release, the remainder of the cast for the Justice League and Lois Lane were announced in July 2022 through posters.

Writing 
Stern developed a pitch for the film after working in an animal shelter, where he noticed how older animals were less likely to be adopted and wondered "what if those pets got superpowers?". Stern was originally unsure what DC characters he was allowed to incorporate in the film, thougth he added Luthor after the character was suggested by DC. This led to the concept of the villain, Lulu, being a guinea pig, as Stern felt "guinea pigs are someone who would have a chip on their shoulder" due to them being used as test subjects, and Lulu being Lex's test subject served as a parallel with Krypto and Superman's relationship.

According to Stern, DC executives suggested adding satirical jokes regarding their properties, which Stern felt allowed the film to make fun of the characters while portraying them respectfully. Stern said the humor regarding DC characters was meant to be rooted in the film's focus on pets, such as portraying Superman as a dog owner or Batman as "a guy who really could use a pet". Early drafts for the movie had Ace in a more prominent role, but his role was changed to co-lead once the filmmakers concluded the focus for the film should be on Krypto's relationship with Superman.

Animation
The animation was provided by Animal Logic in Sydney and Vancouver, which also provided animation for the Warner Animation Group's The Lego Movie series. Approximately 70 animators worked on the film. Animators worked on the film for 2 years, as well as an extra 3–4 months after the film's release date was delayed by a year.

The film's art style was inspired by Art Deco architecture and illustrator J.C. Leyendecker, as well as the Art Deco style from the original Superman comics. Stern wanted the characters and environments to have both visible brushstrokes and "chunky heroic shapes". Character designers Mayumi Nose and Matt Williamês drew inspiration from the Superfriends animated series and Superman comics from the Silver Age of Comic Books for the designs of the characters, while still having a comedic edge to them.

The artists aimed for the film's visuals to reflect the optimistic tone from the Superman comic books, while also being relatable and cartoonish. In order to accomplish this, they had the visuals to be mainly vertical and have a "painted feel". The artists were influenced by the Superman comics from the Golden Age of Comic Books, particularly in those comics' painting style.

Music
The film's original score was composed by Steve Jablonsky. The film's score album was released on July 29, 2022, by WaterTower Music. The Taylor Swift songs "Message in a Bottle" and a re-recording of the song "Bad Blood", "Bad Blood (Taylor's Version)", are also featured in the film.Also included is the original ballad “Count On Me,” written and produced by Jeremy Silver and performed by Jac Ross.  The song plays during an emotional flashback montage sequence where Ace (a tough shelter dog) used to have a great home life with a family.

Marketing
On May 24, 2022, Warner Bros. Consumer Products and DC Comics announced the release of merchandise inspired by the film in collaboration with Fisher-Price. The products include apparel, pet accessories, toys, collectibles, costumes and furniture. McDonald's also announced that their Happy Meals will have toys based on the film.

Release
In January 2019, the film was scheduled to be released on May 21, 2021. The release date was later pushed back to May 20, 2022, in favour of The Matrix Resurrections, another WB film starring Reeves. It was then pushed back to July 29, 2022 (taking the release of Black Adam, which also stars Johnson), among other films from Warner Bros. getting pushed due to production delays. The film's premiere was held on July 27. It is eligible to become available on HBO Max and/or premium video on demand on September 26, 2022 under a plan announced by WarnerMedia in 2021, though subsequent announcements by new parent company Warner Bros. Discovery suggest that streaming timing will be considered on a "case-by-case" basis going forward; it eventually became available on digital on August 23, 2022, and available on 4K UHD, Blu-ray, and DVD beginning on October 4, 2022, along with the official announcement that the movie would be available on HBO Max on September 26, 2022.

Reception

Box office
DC League of Super-Pets grossed $93.7 million in the United States and Canada, and $113.7 million in other territories, for a worldwide total of $207.4 million. The film made $9.3 million on its first day, including $2.2 million from Thursday previews. It went on to debut to $23 million, topping the box office, though coming in at the low-end of expectations. The film made $11.2 million in its sophomore weekend, finishing second behind newcomer Bullet Train. In its third weekend it made $7.1 million, staying in second place.

Critical response
On the review aggregator website Rotten Tomatoes, 73% of 148 critics' reviews are positive, with an average rating of 6.4/10. The website's critical consensus reads, "Although it never quite soars, DC League of Super-Pets is a more than satisfactory diversion for families in search of four-legged fun." Metacritic, which uses a weighted average, assigned the film a score of 56 out of 100, based on 28 critics, indicating "mixed or average reviews". Audiences polled by CinemaScore gave the film an average grade of "A–" on an A+ to F scale, while those at PostTrak gave it 3.5 out of 5 stars.

Nell Minow writing for RogerEbert.com praised the "lively" voice talent, and called the script "smart, exciting, and very funny". Reviewer Dwight Brown wrote, "It doesn't break the mold. However, it is sly, wicked and so much fun. Kids will laugh at the antics. Adults will chuckle when they hear the puns, jokes, catty remarks and doggy banter." Peter Travers of ABC News wrote that while the movie "is not a revolution in animation. It gets the fun done for family audiences." Clarisse Loughrey of The Independent criticized its "limited imagination", adding: "The film is desperately craving an angle—one that certainly can’t be fulfilled by the fact all the pet ownership jokes have already been used up by the Secret Life of Pets series."

Accolades

Future
In August 2022, following the positive financial and audience reception, Johnson stated that the film will be the first installment of a new franchise.

Adaptations
A video game based on the film titled DC League of Super-Pets: The Adventures of Krypto and Ace was announced during DC FanDome, and was released on July 15, 2022.

DC League of Super- Pets: The Great Mxy-Up is a tie-in comic taking place after the events in the movie, featuring Mr. Mxyzptlk.

References

External links

DC page: movie, comics (TGM-U)

 at warnerbros.com

2022 films
2022 3D films
2022 crime action films
2022 action comedy films
2022 action adventure films
2022 science fiction action films
2022 computer-animated films
2020s American animated films
2020s animated superhero films
2020s English-language films
American 3D films
American computer-animated films
American children's animated action films
American children's animated adventure films
American children's animated comic science fiction films
American children's animated superhero films
Animated superhero comedy films
Animated crime films
Works adapted into video games
3D animated films
Animated films based on DC Comics
Fictional cavies
Films about rodents
Films about pets
Animated films about revenge
Films about kidnapping
Films set on fictional planets
Films set in 2022
Films directed by Jared Stern
Films produced by Dwayne Johnson
Films produced by Jared Stern
Films with screenplays by Jared Stern
Films with screenplays by John Whittington (screenwriter)
Films scored by Steve Jablonsky
Films postponed due to the COVID-19 pandemic
Films impacted by the COVID-19 pandemic
Warner Bros. films
Warner Bros. animated films
Warner Animation Group films
Seven Bucks Productions films
Animal Logic films
Legion of Super-Pets